Seeboldia is a genus of moths.  Its only member is Seeboldia korgosella, a moth of the family Pyralidae. It is found in Europe, including France, Spain, Albania and Russia.

References

Phycitini
Moths of Europe
Monotypic moth genera
Taxa named by Émile Louis Ragonot
Pyralidae genera